Charlotte "Lotta" Falkenbäck (born 22 May 1959) is a Swedish former competitive figure skater. She is a three-time Swedish national champion. She placed 13th at two European Championships (1985 and 1986) and competed at the 1988 Winter Olympics, placing 21st.

Competitive highlights

References 

1959 births
Swedish female single skaters
Olympic figure skaters of Sweden
Living people
People from Tumba, Sweden
Sportspeople from Stockholm County
20th-century Swedish women